Lundy is an unincorporated community in Texas County, in the U.S. state of Missouri.

History
A post office called Lundy was established in 1891, and remained in operation until 1919. The community has the name of John Lundy, the proprietor of a local mill.

References

Unincorporated communities in Texas County, Missouri
Unincorporated communities in Missouri